Before the start of the 1905 Tour de France, 78 riders had signed up for the race. Eighteen of those did not start the race, so the Tour began with 60 riders, including former winner Henri Cornet and future winners René Pottier and Lucien Petit-Breton. The riders were not grouped in teams, but most of them rode with an individual sponsor. Two of the cyclists—Catteau and Lootens—were Belgian, all other cyclists were French. Leading up to the start of the Tour, Wattelier, Trousselier, Pottier and Augereau were all considered the most likely contenders to win the event.

By starting number

By nationality

References

1905 Tour de France
1905